Korean mixed script is a form of writing the Korean language that uses a mixture of the Korean alphabet or hangul and hanja, the Korean name for Chinese characters.  The distribution on how to write words usually follows that all native Korean words, including suffixes, particles, and honorific markers are generally written in hangul and never in hanja.  Sino-Korean vocabulary or hanja-eo, either words borrowed from Chinese or created from Sino-Korean roots, were generally always written in hanja although very rare or complex characters were often substituted with hangul.  Although the Korean alphabet was introduced and taught to people beginning in 1446, most literature until the early twentieth century was written in literary Chinese known as hanmun.

Although examples of mixed-script writing are as old as hangul itself, the mixing of hangul and hanja together in sentences became the official writing system of the Korean language at the end of the nineteenth century, when reforms ended the primacy of literary Chinese in literature, science and government.  This style of writing, in competition with hangul-only writing, continued as the formal written version of Korean for most of the twentieth century.  The script slowly gave way to hangul-only usage in North Korea by 1949, while it continues in South Korea to a limited extent. However, with the decrease in hanja education, the number of hanja in use has slowly dwindled and in the twenty-first century, very few hanja are used at all. In Yanbian Korean Autonomous Prefecture in China, the local newspaper Northeast Korean People's Daily published the "workers and peasants version" which used all-hangul in text, in addition to the existing "cadre version" that had mixed script, for the convenience of grassroots Korean people. Starting April 20, 1952, the newspaper abolished the "cadre version" and published in hangul only, soon the entire publishing industry adopted the hangul-only style.

Development
The development of hanja-honyong required two major developments in orthographic traditions of the Korean Peninsula.  The first was the adoption of hanja, around the beginning of the Three Kingdom period of Korea.  The second was the introduction of hangul in 1446.

Promulgation of Hunminjeong-eum

Introduction

Despite the advent of vernacular writing in Korean using hanja, these publications remained the dominion of the literate class, comprising royalty and nobility, Buddhist monks, Confucian scholars, civil servants and members of the upper classes as the ability to read these texts required proficient ability to understand the meaning of the Chinese characters, with both their adopted Sino-Korean pronunciation and their native gloss.  To rectify this, King Sejong the Great summoned a team of scholars to devise a new script for the Korean language, leading to the 1446 promulgation of 
the hunminjeong-eum, 'correct pronunciation for teaching the people.'  The problems surrounding literacy in literary Chinese to the common populace was summarized in the opening of Sejong's proclamation, written in literary Chinese:

Because the speech of this country is different from that of China, it [the spoken language] does not match the [Chinese] letters. Therefore, even if the ignorant want to communicate, many of them in the end cannot state their concerns. Saddened by this, I have [had] 28 letters newly made. It is my wish that all the people may easily learn these letters and that [they] be convenient for daily use.

The script is now the primary and most commonplace method to write the Korean language, and is known as hangul in South Korea, from han but homophonous with Sino-Korean han ((), 'Korean,' and the native word gul, 'script.'  In North Korea, the script is known as joseongul from Joseon, an old name of Korea.  The promulgation of the indigenous script is celebrated as a national holiday on 9 October in the south and 15 January in the north, respectively.

The new script rapidly spread to the segments of the population traditionally denied access to education such as farmers, fishermen, women of the lower classes, rural merchants and young children.  Several attempts to ban or over-turn the use of hangul were initiated but failed to halt its spread.  These attempts were initiated by several rulers, who discovered disparaging remarks about their reigns, and the upper classes, whose grip on power and influence was predicated upon their ability to read, write and interpret classical Chinese texts and commentaries thereof. The scholarly élite mocked the sole use of hangul pseudo-deferentially as jinseo ), 'real script.'  Other insults such as 'women's script,' 'children's script' and 'farmer's hand' are known anecdotally but are not found in the literature.

Spread
  
Despite the fears of the upper classes and scholarly élite, the introduction of the early hangul actually increased proficiency in literary Chinese.  New-style hanja dictionaries appeared, arranging words according to their alphabetic order  when spelled out in hangul, and showing compound words containing the hanja as well as its Sino-Korean and its native, sometimes archaic, pronunciation — a system still in use for many contemporary Korean-language hanja dictionaries.  The syllable blocks could be written easily between meaningful units of Chinese characters, as annotations, but also began to replace the complex notation of the early gugyeol and idu, including hyangchal, although gugyeol and idu were not officially abolished until the end of the 19th century in part because literary Chinese was still the official written language of the royal court, nobility, governance and diplomacy until its usage was finally abolished in the early twentieth century and its local production mostly ceased by mid-century.

The real spread of hangul to all elements of Korean society was the late eighteenth century beginning of two literary trends.  The ancient sijo, 'seasonal tune,' poetry.  Although sijo, heavily influenced by Chinese Tang dynasty poetry, was long written in Chinese, authors began writing poems in Korean written solely with hangul.  At the same time, gasa, 'song lyric,' poetry was similarly spread.  Korean women of the upper classes created gasa by translating or finding inspiration in the old poems, written in literary Chinese, and translating them into Korean, but as the name suggests, were popularly sung.  Although Catholic and Protestant missionaries initially attempted to evangelise the Korean Peninsula starting with the nobility using Chinese translations and works, in the early nineteenth century, Bishop Siméon-François Berneux, or Jang Gyeong-il mandated that all publications be written only in hangul and all students in the missionary schools were required to use it.  Protestant and other Catholic missionaries followed suit, facilitating the spread of Christianity in Korea, but also created a large corpus of Korean-language material written in hangul only.

Mixed script or Hanja-honyong

The practice of mixing hangul into hanja began as early as the introduction of hangul.  Even King Sejong's promulgation proclamation was written in literary Chinese and idu passages to explain the alphabet and mixed passages that help 'ease' the reader into the use of the alphabet.  The first novel written in hangul, Yongbieocheonga, Songs of the Dragons Flying to Heaven, is actually mostly written in what would now be considered mixed-script writing.  Another major literary work touted as a masterpiece of hangul-based literature, the 1590 translation of The Analects of Confucius by Yi Yulgok is also written entirely in hanja-honyong.

Many Koreans today attribute hanja-honyong to the Japanese occupation of Korea. This is in part due to the visual similarity of Chinese characters interspersed with alphabetic text of Japanese-language texts to Korean-language texts in mixed script, and the numerous assimilation and suppression schemes of the occupational government carried out against the Korean people, language and culture.  In fact, hanja-honyong was commonplace amongst the royalty, yangban and jung-in classes for personal records and informal letters shortly after the introduction of the alphabet, and replaced the routine use of idu by the jung-in.  The heyday of hanja-honyong arrived with the Gap-o reforms passed in 1894 – 1896 after the Donghak Peasant Rebellion.  The reforms ended the client status of Korea to the Qing dynasty emperors, elevating King Gojong to Emperor Gwangmu, ended the supremacy of literary Chinese and idu script, ended the gwageo imperial examinations.  In place of literary Chinese, the Korean language written in the 'national letters'—now understood as an alternate name for hangul but at the time referred to hanja-honyong—was now the language of governance.

Due to over a thousand years of literary Chinese supremacy, the early hanja-honyong texts were written in a stiff, prosaic style, with a preponderance of Sino-Korean terms barely removed from gugyeol, but the written language was quickly adapted into the current format with a more natural style, using hanja only where a Sino-Korean loan word was read in Sino-Korean pronunciation and hangul for native words and grammatical particles. One of the most important publications the end of the Joseon period was the weekly newspaper, Hanseong Jugang, one of the first written in the more natural style several years before the Gap-o reforms.  The popular newspaper was originally started as a hanja-only publication that lasted only a few weeks before they switched formats.  During the reforms, Yu Giljun
published his travel diaries, Seoyu Gyeonmun or Observations on Travels to the West was a best-seller at this time.  The success of Hanseong Jugang and Seoyu Gyeonmun urged the literati to switch to vernacular Korean in hanja-honyong.

Decline of mixed script 
Mixed script was a commonly used means of writing, although Hangŭl exclusive writing has been used concurrently, in Korea after the decline of literary Chinese, known as hanmun (Korean: 한문; Hanja: 漢文). Mixed script could be commonly found in non-fiction writing, news papers, etc. until the enacting of Park Chung-hee's 5 Year Plan for Hangŭl Exclusivity hangŭl jŏnyong ogaenyŏn gyehuik an (Korean: 한글전용 5개년 계획안; Hanja: 한글專用 5個年 計劃案) in 1968 banned the use and teaching of Hanja in public schools, as well as forbade its use in the military, with the goal of completely eliminating Hanja in writing by 1972 through legislative and executive means. However, due to public backlash, in 1972 Park's government allowed for the teaching of Hanja in special classes but maintained a ban on Hanja use in textbooks and other learning materials outside of the classes. This reverse step however, was optional so the availability of Hanja education was dependent on the school one went to. Park's Hanja ban was not formally lifted until 1992 under the government of Kim Young-Sam. In 1999 the government of Kim Dae-Jung actively promoted Hanja by placing it on signs on the road, at bus stops, and in subways. In 1999 Han Mun was reintroduced as a school elective and in 2001 the Hanja Proficiency Test hanja nŭngryŏk gŏmjŏng sihŏm (Korean: 한자능력검정시험; Hanja: 漢字能力檢定試驗) was introduced. In 2005 an older law, the Law Concerning Hangul Exclusivity hangŭl jŏnyonge gwahak pŏmnyul (Korean: 한글전용에 관한 법률; Hanja: 한글專用에 關한 法律) was repealed as well. In 2013 all elementary schools in Seoul started teaching Hanja. However, the result is that Koreans who were educated in this period having never been formally educated in Hanja are unable to use them and thus the use of Hanja has plummeted in orthography until the modern day. Where Hanja is now very rarely used and is almost only used for abbreviations in newspaper headlines (e.g. 中 for China, 韓 for Korea, 美 for the United States, 日 for Japan, etc.), for clarification in text where a word might be confused for another due to homophones (e.g. 이사장(李 社長) vs. 이사장(理事長)), or for stylistic use such as the 辛 (Korean: 신라면; Hanja: 辛拉麵) used on Shin Ramyŏn packaging.

Structure
In a typical hanja-honyong texts, traditionally all words that were of Sino-Korean origin, either composed from Chinese character compounds natively or loan words directly from Chinese, were written in hanja although particularly rare or complicated hanja were often disambiguated with the hangul pronunciation and perhaps a gloss of the meaning.  Native words, including Korean grammatical postpositions, were written in hangul. Due to the reforms the close of the Joseon dynasty, native words were not supposed to be written in hanja, as they were in the idu and hyangchal systems which were abolished at this time.

Examples

Visual processing
In Korean mixed-script writing, especially in formal and academic contexts, the majority of semantic or 'content' words are generally written in hanja whereas most syntax or 'function' is conveyed with grammatical endings, particles and honorifics written in hangul.  Japanese, which continues to use a heavily Chinese character-laden orthography, is read in the same way.  The Chinese characters, have different angled strokes and oftentimes more strokes than a typical syllable block of hangul letters, and definitely more so than Japanese kana, enabling readers of both respective languages to process content information very quickly.

Korean readers, however, have a few more handicaps than Japanese readers.  For instance, although academic, legal, scientific, history and literature have a higher proportion of Sino-Korean vocabulary, Korean has more indigenous vocabulary used for semantic information, so older Korean readers often scan the hanja first and then piece together by reading the hangul content words to piece the meaning.  Japanese avoids this problem by writing most content words with their Sino-Japanese equivalent of kanji, whereas reading Sino-Korean vocabulary according to their native Korean pronunciation or translation was banned in previous reforms, so only a Sino-Korean word can be written in hanja.  The handicaps are avoided by the adoption of spaces inserted between phrases in modern Korean, limiting phrases, generally, to a content word and a grammatical particles, allowing readers to spot the native Korean content words faster.

In reading texts, Koreans are faster at reading out passages written in hangul than in mixed script.  However, although 'reading' is faster, understanding the texts is facilitated with the use of hanja in higher order language to the large number of homophones in the language, such as the continued role of 'hanja disambiguation' even in hangul-only texts.  For instance, daehan (대한), usually understood in the context of the 'Great Han' (大韓, 대한) or 'Great Korean people,' can also indicate (大寒,대한) 'big winter,' the coldest part at the end of January and beginning of February, (大旱, 대한) 'severe drought,' (大漢, 대한) 'Great Chinese people,' (大恨, 대한) 'deep resentment,' (對韓, 대한) 'anti-Korean,' (對漢, 대한), 'anti-Chinese,' or (對한) 'about or 'toward.'  Readers of technical and academic texts often have to clarify terms for the listener to avoid ambiguity, and most hanja are only used when necessary to clear confusion.  As can be seen in the example below, the hanja in an otherwise mostly native vocabulary song stand out from the hangul text, thus appearing almost like bolded and enlarged text.  This was further amplified in older texts, when hangul blocks were sometimes written smaller than the surrounding hanja.

Hanja disambiguation
Very few hanja are used in modern Korean writing, but are occasionally seen in academic and technical texts and formal publications, such as newspapers, where the rare hanja is used as a shorthand in newspaper headlines, especially if the native Korean equivalent is a longer word, or more importantly, to disambiguate the meaning of a word. Sino-Korean words make up over 70% of the Korean language, although only a third of them are in common usage, but that proportion increases in formal and highbrow publications. A native Korean syllable may have up to 1,300 possible combinations compared to the Sino-Korean inventory of 400. Although Middle Korean developed tones that may have facilitated differentiation of words, this development was lost in the transition to modern Korean, making many words homophones of each other. Cantonese, whose pronunciation of the characters is similar to the Sino-Korean pronunciation due to its conservative phonology and the ancient age in which these words entered Korean, has several words pronounced :  'new',  'body',  'deity',  'difficult' or 'spicy',  'large clam',  'kidney' and  'to lament.'

By the mid-1990s, when even the most conservative newspapers stopped publishing in hanja-honyong, with most ceasing in the 1980s, and switched to a generally all-hangul format, the use of characters to clarify the meaning of a word, 'hanja disambiguation', is still common, in part due to complaints from older subscribers that were educated in the mixed script and were used to using hanja glosses. From this 2018 article from the conservative newspaper The Chosun Ilbo, two phrases are disambiguated with hanja: 
  (hangul with hanja disambiguation)
  (hanja with hangul disambiguation)
 "The pinnacle years of the 2003–2004 season was a championship victory for the undefeated league.  The undefeated championship of that period is still 'roast meat' (praised)."

Although in many instances, context can help discern the meaning, and many of the possible variants are obscure or rare characters that would be encountered only in either classical literature or literary Chinese thus limiting choices.  In more relaxed publications, where hanja disambiguation is less common, Sino-Korean terms are avoided as much as possible, although this may appear as "dumbed down" material to some readers.  Context can often facilitate the meaning of many terms.  Many Sino-Korean terms that are rare and only encountered in ancient texts in literary Chinese are almost unknown and would not even be part of the hanja taught in education, limiting the number of likely choices.

Example 
The text below is the preamble to the constitution of the Republic of Korea. The first text is written in Hangul; the second is its mixed script version; and the third is its unofficial English translation.

We, the people of Korea, proud of a resplendent history and traditions dating from time immemorial, upholding the cause of the Provisional Government of the Republic of Korea born of the March First Independence Movement of 1919 and the democratic ideals of the April Revolution of 1960, having assumed the mission of democratic reform and peaceful unification of our homeland and having determined to consolidate national unity with justice, humanitarianism and brotherly love, and to destroy all social vices and injustice, and to afford equal opportunities to every person and provide for the fullest development of individual capabilities in all fields, including political, economic, social and cultural life by further strengthening the free and democratic basic order conducive to private initiative and public harmony, and to help each person discharge those duties and responsibilities concomitant to freedoms and rights, and to elevate the quality of life for all citizens and contribute to lasting world peace and the common prosperity of mankind and thereby to ensure security, liberty and happiness for ourselves and our posterity forever, do hereby amend, through national referendum following a resolution by the National Assembly, the Constitution, ordained and established on July 12, 1948, and amended eight times subsequently.

October 29, 1987

See also 

 Hanja and Sino-Korean vocabulary
Debate on mixed script and Hangul exclusivity
 Kanji and Sino-Japanese vocabulary
 Hán tự and Sino-Vietnamese vocabulary
 New Korean Orthography
 Egyptian hieroglyphs, another mixed logographic and segmental writing system.

References

Further reading 
 Lukoff, Fred (1982). "Introduction." A First Reader in Korean Writing in Mixed Script. Seoul: Yonsei University Press.

Korean writing system